The 1974 Benson & Hedges British Open Championships was held at Abbeydale Park in Sheffield from 31 January - 8 February 1974. Geoff Hunt won his second title defeating Mo Yasin in the final with a walkover. Mohammed Yasin had to concede the final because of a badly sprained ankle and therefore did not compete, this was the first time a final could not be held since 1934. As a consolation the crowd was treated to Hunt against Barrington in an exhibition match.

Seeds

Draw and results

Final
 Geoff Hunt beat  Mohammed Yasin w/o

Section 1

Section 2

References

Men's British Open Squash Championships
Squash in England
1974 in squash
1974 in British sport
1970s in Sheffield
Sports competitions in Sheffield
Men's British Open Squash Championship
Men's British Open Squash Championship